The Wonderful Story of Henry Sugar and Six More is a collection of seven short stories written by Roald Dahl. They are generally regarded as being aimed at a slightly older audience than many of his other children's books. The book was first published in London in 1977 by Jonathan Cape.

The stories were written at varying times throughout his life. Two of the stories are autobiographical in nature; one describes how he first became a writer while the other describes some of Dahl's experiences as a fighter pilot in the Second World War. Another piece in the collection is a non-fiction account of a British farmer finding a legendary haul of ancient Roman treasure. 

In 2023, a story from the collection, "The Wonderful Story of Henry Sugar", will be adapted into a film directed by Wes Anderson with Benedict Cumberbatch as the titular character Henry Sugar.

Chapters

The Boy Who Talked with Animals
This is a first-person fiction piece of medium-length writing. The narrator, on advice from friends, decides to vacation in Jamaica. One night, a sea turtle, ancient and huge, is caught by a group of fishermen. Rich people want to buy it, while the manager of a nearby hotel wants to make turtle soup and eat him but both plans are foiled when a little boy and his parents appear, and the child screams at the people, calling them "horrible and cruel". His parents reveal that the boy loves animals deeply, and even talks to them. His father pays off the fisherfolk and hotel manager, and the turtle is set free. The next day, the boy is missing, and the fisherfolk reveal that they have seen the child riding on the back of the sea turtle into the distance.

The Hitch-Hiker

This is another fictional first person narrative. The narrator in this case has a brand new BMW 3.3 Li, and is enjoying a trip down the highway when he spots a hitchhiker. He lets the man into his car; the passenger is described as being curiously rat-like, with long, white fingers. They engage in conversation, revealing the man's Cockney accent and attitudes.

As they talk, the narrator is urged by the hitchhiker to test the car's engine power by going ever faster.  This results in a police motorbike pulling them over for speeding. The police officer who writes the ticket acts particularly cruel, threatening the narrator with a long prison sentence and a huge fine.

The narrator is despondent until his new friend challenges the narrator to guess his true profession. As he does, the hitchhiker suddenly reveals various items from the narrator's person, from a wallet to a watch to the narrator's shoelace. The narrator accuses the hitchhiker of being a pickpocket. The hitchhiker disagrees, claiming that he is a "fingersmith" – just as a goldsmith has mastered gold, he has mastered the use of his fingers.  He claims that he is never caught due to his "fantastic fingers".  He then reveals that he has stolen both the police officer's notebooks, which contain the tickets and details against them. Relieved, the narrator and the hitchhiker then stop on the highway to light a bonfire of the notebooks.

The Mildenhall Treasure

This is a non-fiction account of a labourer named Gordon Butcher who uncovered a large quantity of Roman treasure, the Mildenhall Treasure, in a field that he was ploughing for a farmer when he found pure silver and another man tried to deceive him into thinking it was worth nothing.

It was first published in the Saturday Evening Post magazine in the US in 1946 and was first published in book form in this collection. It was published as a single title edition in 1999 by Jonathan Cape, with illustrations by Ralph Steadman.

The Swan
"The Swan" is a short story about the boys Ernie and his friend Raymond, who like to bully Peter Watson. When Ernie receives a rifle for his fifteenth birthday, they both shoot birds on their way to the rabbit field. They menace Peter with the rifle and tie him to railway tracks, but Peter survives the train by sinking into the ballast. 

At first in hope of throwing Peter, still tied, into a lake, Ernie shoots a duck instead and sends Peter to obtain it. Later, Ernie shoots a swan against Peter's wishes, and Peter wishes that the swan could come back to life. Ernie, in answer, cuts off both of the swan's wings, ties the wings to Peter's arms, and says: “Look, I have brought the swan back to life!”; then forces Peter to leap from a tree. 

When shot in the leg, Peter falls off the branch, but grabs onto another; sees a bright light; and jumps off the branch, which creates the image of an enormous swan flying over the village. Peter then falls into his mother's garden, where Mrs. Watson finds him, calls a doctor and an ambulance, and cuts the wings from his arms.

The Wonderful Story of Henry Sugar
Henry Sugar, an independently wealthy man who enjoys gambling, finds and reads a doctor's report on a strange patient the doctor met while stationed at a hospital in India. This patient, who called himself "The Man Who Sees Without Using His Eyes", had the ability to see even after the doctors had medically sealed the man's eyes shut and bandaged his head. The man was part of a circus act and used his ability to make money.  When interviewed in more detail by the curious doctors he gave an account which they wrote up.  The man claimed he had been interested in magic all his life, and managed to study with Yogi Hardawar in India, by which he develops the ability to see through thin objects such a paper or playing cards, and can see around solid objects such as a wooden door if he is allowed a finger or hand around it. The doctors decide the man could be of great benefit as a teacher of the blind, and return to the circus, only to find the show canceled, when the Man Who Sees Without Using His Eyes has died.

Henry realizes that the book contains a detailed description of the meditation method used to gain this ability; he steals the book and then decides to try to master the art described. After only three years, Henry masters the ability to see through playing cards, and can even predict the future. Henry uses these abilities in a casino, where he becomes cognisant of other gamblers' greed. He uses his powers to predict which number will win on a roulette wheel, then later makes a great deal of money at the blackjack tables, and refrains from more feats in fear of publicity.

Henry wins enough money to buy a small house or a large automobile but realizes that the thrill of winning or losing has been eradicated by his ease. The next morning Henry has an acute revulsion towards the money, for this reason he throws the money off his balcony. Soon, a near-riot breaks out as the people of London rush to collect the twenty pound notes falling from Henry's apartment. A police officer scolds Henry and suggests that he find a more legal form of charity; whereupon Henry vows to establish the most well-equipped and supportive orphanages on the planet. This plan works well until he reaches Las Vegas, where he unknowingly collects a huge sum from three casinos owned by the same Mafioso, and narrowly escapes the owner's thugs. Thereafter Henry flies to Hollywood, where he enlists the aid of a famous makeup artist to create various disguises and false identities to protect himself. This works successfully, and with the aid of his accountant and the artist he successfully travels the world under a number of names and identities. At the end of the story, the author reveals that he was selected, seemingly at random, by Henry's accountant to write Henry's story, as the man has died. The narrator is shocked to hear all of the events, and also comments that Henry's wish came true—the Henry Sugar Orphanages, established all across the globe, are indeed the best in the world.

The story is considered to be mildly satiric of Dahl's critics, who would sometimes nickname him the "Master of Nastiness". Here, he gives a happy ending, and even gives a sweet and rather anodyne name to the protagonist.

Lucky Break
This is a non-fictional account, similar to Roald Dahl's Boy and Going Solo albeit in a more concise form. It discusses the events in his life that led him to become a writer, including a meeting with a famous writer, who helped to launch his career. The story is about Dahl's school and all the teachers, until after the publication of his first story.

A Piece of Cake
This is an autobiographical account of Dahl's time as a fighter pilot in the Second World War, particularly the details of how Dahl was injured and eventually forced to leave the Mediterranean arena. The original version of the story was written for C. S. Forester so that he could get the gist of Dahl's story and rewrite it in his own words. Forester was so impressed by the story (Dahl at the time did not believe himself a capable writer) that he sent it without modification to his agent, who had it published (as "Shot Down Over Libya") in the Saturday Evening Post, thereby to initiate Dahl's writing career. This short story was also published in one of Dahl's many collections of short stories Over to You which was first published in 1946. The traditional English nursery rhyme "Oranges and Lemons" makes an appearance in the story.

Film adaptation 

In January 2022, it was announced that Wes Anderson would direct an adaptation of "The Wonderful Story of Henry Sugar" with Benedict Cumberbatch as the titular character alongside Dev Patel, Ben Kingsley, Richard Ayoade and Ralph Fiennes. It will be distributed by Netflix.

Editions
  (hardcover, 2001)
  (hardcover, 1979)
  (hardcover, 1977)
  (paperback, 2000)
  (paperback, 1995)
  (paperback, 1988)
  (paperback, 1982)

See also

 Roald Dahl
Boy (Book)

References

1977 short story collections
Children's books by Roald Dahl
Short story collections by Roald Dahl
Jonathan Cape books
Children's short story collections
1977 children's books
Short stories adapted into films